Semioscopis megamicrella is a species of moth of the family Depressariidae. It was described by Harrison Gray Dyar Jr. in 1902. It is found in the northern United States and southern Canada.

The wingspan is 15–25 mm. Adults are on wing from April to May.

References

megamicrella
Moths of North America
Moths described in 1902